A World of Keflings is a city-building video game developed by NinjaBee for the Xbox Live Arcade. It was released on December 22, 2010, and is a sequel to the 2008 video game A Kingdom for Keflings.

Gameplay
The game follows the player's Avatar (or Mii, in the Wii U version), who is a giant in the world of the Keflings. As in the previous game, the Keflings are tiny people, similar to elves, who need the player's assistance to build-up their kingdoms. The player helps them by harvesting resources and constructing buildings, tasks that can be delegated to the Keflings as well. Throughout the game, the player completes missions and visits three separate kingdoms; the Ice Kingdom, the Forest Kingdom, and the Desert Kingdom. Each kingdom features its own unique climate, resources, and characters. The player can gain access to additional content if they also own ilomilo, Cloning Clyde or Raskulls.

In addition to the online multiplayer component carried over from its predecessor, A World of Keflings features local multiplayer, allowing two players to work together in the same world to accomplish tasks.

Development, release, and marketing 
A World of Keflings was released for Xbox Live Arcade on December 22, 2010, for the Windows 8 Game Store on March 13, 2013, and for the Wii U on November 13, 2014. It is described by its developers as "much more than a sequel," and was designed with a more diverse environment and a heavier story focus. The game was released as part of Microsoft's Games for the Holidays promotion, along with ilomilo and Raskulls. It also became part of the Avatar Famestar program.

Three downloadable expansion packs were released for the Xbox Live version, known as The Curse of the Zombiesaurus, It Came from Outer Space, and Sugar, Spice, and Not So Nice, each following a different plot taking place after the main game. These expansions were included along with the Wii U release.

Reception 

A World of Keflings received generally favorable reviews for the Xbox 360 version, earning 77/100, and mixed or average reviews for the Wii U version, scoring 70/100 on review aggregator Metacritic  Levi Buchanan of IGN gave the game an 8.0 out of 10, praising its humor and pacing, though pointing out the difficulty of working in crowded areas.

According to Gamasutra, the game was a top seller for the first half of 2011, and sold over 224,000 copies by the end of the year. It sold 1,800,000 copies worldwide as of 2018.

References

External links
 

2010 video games
City-building games
Microsoft games
NinjaBee games
Video game sequels
Video games developed in the United States
Wii U eShop games
Windows games
Xbox 360 games
Xbox 360 Live Arcade games
Multiplayer and single-player video games